The Church of St Mary in Seavington St Mary, Somerset, England, dates from the 15th century and is recorded in the National Heritage List for England as a designated Grade II* listed building.

The former Anglican parish Church of St Mary has 13th-century origins, but the current building is largely from the late 15th century, with restoration around 1880. The three-stage tower is from the 16th century, and contains six bells. Three of these date from 1621 and were made by George Purdue of Closworth; the others are from the 20th century, and were made by John Taylor & Co in Loughborough.

The parish was previously held as a chapelry of South Petherton by Bruton Abbey and after the Dissolution of the Monasteries belonged to Bristol Cathedral.

It is a redundant church in the care of the Churches Conservation Trust.  The church was declared redundant on 1 July 1983, and was vested in the Trust on 15 May 1985.

See also
 List of churches preserved by the Churches Conservation Trust in South West England
 List of ecclesiastical parishes in the Diocese of Bath and Wells

References

15th-century church buildings in England
Church of England church buildings in South Somerset
Grade II* listed churches in Somerset
Grade II* listed buildings in South Somerset
English Gothic architecture in Somerset
Churches preserved by the Churches Conservation Trust
Former churches in Somerset